The lateral half of the great wing of the sphenoid bone articulates, by means of a synchondrosis, with the petrous part of the temporal bone. Between these two bones on the under surface of the skull, is a furrow, the 'sulcus of auditory tubule, for the lodgement of the cartilaginous part of the auditory tube.

References 

Foramina of the skull